Església Major is a Barcelona Metro station in the municipality of Santa Coloma de Gramenet, in the northern part of the metropolitan area of Barcelona underneath Plaça dels Enamorats. The station is named after the town's main church, located in Plaça de l'Església. It's served by L9 and is one of the stations comprising the first part of Line 9 to be opened, between Can Zam and Can Peixauet, inaugurated on 13 December 2009. Sanchez-Piulachs, Arquitectes S.L were in charge of the design of Església Major.

Services

See also
List of Barcelona Metro stations
Església Major, Santa Coloma de Gramenet

External links
Trenscat.com

Barcelona Metro line 9 stations
Railway stations in Spain opened in 2009
Transport in Santa Coloma de Gramenet